Charanyca is a genus of moths of the family Noctuidae.

Species
 Charanyca apfelbecki (Rebel, 1901)
 Charanyca docilis (Walker, 1857)
 Charanyca ferrosqualida Simonyi, 1996
 Charanyca ferruginea (Esper, [1785]) – brown rustic
 Charanyca trigrammica (Hufnagel, 1766) – treble lines

References
 charanyca at Markku Savela's Lepidoptera and Some Other Life Forms
 Charanyca. Natural History Museum, London.

Hadeninae